Project 11-41 is the third album by rock band Slapshock, released in 2002. It was certified platinum in the Philippines.

Track listing

Personnel 
Vladimir Garcia – vocals
Lee Nadela - bass
Leandro Ansing - guitar
Jerry Basco - guitar
Richard Evora – drums

Additional Musician:
DJ Arbie Won - Turntablist (track 3)
Mark Escueta - Drums (track 3 & 5)

Album Credits 
Rico Blanco – producer
Angee Rozul – engineer

References 

Slapshock albums
2002 albums